Telecine, is transferring motion picture film into video and is performed in a color suite.
 Rede Telecine, are six premium television channels in Brazil, jointly owned by Globosat, 20th Century Fox, Paramount Pictures, Universal Pictures, MGM and DreamWorks.